, real name Sano Toyofusa, was an 18th-century scholar, kyōka poet, and ukiyo-e artist of Japanese folklore. Born to a family of high-ranking servants to the Tokugawa shogunate, he was trained by Kanō school artists Kanō Gyokuen and Kanō Chikanobu, although he was never officially recognized as a Kanō school painter.

Art career
After retiring from service to the shogunate, he became a teacher to numerous apprentices in poetry and painting. He was among the first to apply Kanō techniques to ukiyo-e printmaking, inventing key new techniques along the way, such as fuki-bokashi, which allowed for replicating color gradations. Most famously, he was the teacher of Kitagawa Utamaro and Utagawa Toyoharu.

Sekien is best known for his mass-produced illustrated books of yōkai that had appeared in Hyakki Yagyō monster parade scrolls. The first book proved popular enough to spawn three sequels, the last of which features yōkai mainly out of Sekien's imagination. Although sometimes described as a "demonologist," his work is better described as a literary parody of encyclopedias such as the Japanese Wakan Sansai Zue or the Chinese Classic of Mountains and Seas, which were popular in Japan at the time. His portrayals of these creatures from folklore essentially established their visual portrayals in the public's mind and deeply inspired other Japanese artists in his own and later eras, including ukiyo-e artists Tsukioka Yoshitoshi, Kawanabe Kyōsai, and manga artist Mizuki Shigeru.

Notable works

References

External links
Toriyamabiko, a copy of his first book, in the collection of the Museum of Fine Arts, Boston
Bridge of dreams: the Mary Griggs Burke collection of Japanese art, a catalog from The Metropolitan Museum of Art Libraries (fully available online as PDF), which contains material on Toriyama Sekien (see index)

1712 births
1788 deaths
Ukiyo-e artists
18th-century Japanese people
18th-century Japanese artists
Artists from Tokyo Metropolis